Wilfred Tranter (born 5 March 1945) is an English former footballer who played as a half-back. Born in Pendlebury, Lancashire, he played for Manchester United, Brighton & Hove Albion, Fulham, Baltimore Bays and St. Louis Stars. He made his Football League debut for Manchester United two days after his 19th birthday on 7 March 1964, when regular centre-half Bill Foulkes missed the trip to West Ham United due to injury; Tranter was praised for his defensive handling of West Ham forward Johnny Byrne as Manchester United won 2–0. It proved to be his only appearance for the club and he left for Brighton in May 1966. He spent two-and-a-half years on the south coast, including a four-month loan spell with the Baltimore Bays in the North American Soccer League (NASL) between April and August 1968, before joining Fulham in January 1969. At the end of his three-and-a-half-year stay in London, he went back on loan to the United States during the 1972 NASL season to play for the St. Louis Stars.

References

External links
Profile at StretfordEnd.co.uk
Profile at MUFCInfo.com

1945 births
Living people
People from Pendlebury
English footballers
Association football midfielders
Manchester United F.C. players
Brighton & Hove Albion F.C. players
Fulham F.C. players
St. Louis Stars (soccer) players
Baltimore Bays players
English Football League players
North American Soccer League (1968–1984) players
English expatriate sportspeople in the United States
Expatriate soccer players in the United States
English expatriate footballers